Eric Wauters (12 May 1951 – 21 October 1999) was a Belgian equestrian and Olympic medalist. He was born in Antwerp. He competed in show jumping at the 1976 Summer Olympics in Montreal, and won a bronze medal with the Belgian team. Wauters committed suicide in his home in 1999.

References

1951 births
1999 suicides
Belgian male equestrians
Olympic equestrians of Belgium
Olympic bronze medalists for Belgium
Equestrians at the 1972 Summer Olympics
Equestrians at the 1976 Summer Olympics
Equestrians at the 1996 Summer Olympics
Olympic medalists in equestrian
Medalists at the 1976 Summer Olympics
Sportspeople from Antwerp
Suicides in Belgium
20th-century Belgian people